Numerous people wrote and composed music for the Sailor Moon metaseries, with frequent lyrical contributions by creator Naoko Takeuchi. Takanori Arisawa, who earned the "Golden Disk Grand Prize" from Columbia Records for his work on the first series soundtrack in 1993, composed and arranged the background musical scores, including the spinoffs, games, and movies. In 1998, 2000, and 2001 he won the JASRAC International Award for most international royalties, owing largely to the popularity of Sailor Moon music in other nations.
Over 40 Japanese music albums were released for the anime, many of which were remixes of the previous albums in jazz style, music box, French, etc. In addition, 33 different CD singles were released, many of them centered around specific characters.

Sailor Moon soundtracks

Bishōjo Senshi Sailor Moon Ongaku Shuu
 was released on May 1, 1992 as a CD and re-released on March 17, 2010 as a HQCD.

Bishōjo Senshi Sailor Moon -Ai wa Dokoni Aruno?-
 was released in 1992 as a CD and re-released in 2010 as a HQCD.

Bishōjo Senshi Sailor Moon -in Another Dream-
 was released in 2010 as a HQCD.

Bishōjo Senshi Sailor Moon R Ongaku Shuu
 Released April 1, 1993 and was later re-released in 2010 as a HQCD.

This is the soundtrack for the second season. It contains the background music from the two parts of Sailor Moon R: the Alien arc (Ail+Ann or "Ann & Alan" in the dub) and the Black Moon/ChibiUsa arc which makes up the majority of Sailor Moon R. The two songs included on this CD are the opening and closing theme song for Sailor Moon R ("Otome no Policy") and "Suki to Itte", a song used as background in Sailor Moon R. Both are sung by ISHIDA Yoko, who also sang the popular Sailor Moon R/Sailor Moon S battle song "Ai no Senshi" (Soldier of Love).

Bishoujo Senshi Sailor Moon R - Mirai he Mukatte
 was released in 2010 as a HQCD.

Bishojo Senshi Sailor Moon R - Gekijou Ban Music Collection -Ongaku Shu-
Soundtrack for Sailor Moon R: The Movie entitled  was released in 2010 as a HQCD.

Bishojo Senshi Sailor Moon S Ongaku Shuu 
 was first released on June 1, 1994 and re-released on March 17, 2010 as a HQCD.

The soundtrack for third season includes all the Sailor Moon S make-up and attack music and the Outer Senshi make-up, appearance and attack music. Not included are the opening theme (the second version of "Moonlight Densetsu", performed by Moon Lips) and the ending theme Tuxedo Mirage.

Bishojo Senshi Sailor Moon SuperS Ongaku Shuu 
 was first released on September 21, 1995, and re-released on March 17, 2010 as a HQCD.

This is the soundtrack for the fourth season of Sailor Moon. The musical cues from SuperS also appear on Music Box Disc 5, rearranged somewhat differently from this CD. Nehellenia's theme music is located on the Sailor Moon S Movie Music Collection: it is the same as Princess Snow Kaguya's theme music.

Bishojo Senshi Sailor Moon Sailor Stars Music Collection
 was first released on July 20, 1996 and re-released on March 17, 2010 as a HQCD.

This soundtrack features the background music from the Nehellenia portion of Sailor Stars and the opening & closing theme songs. The slower version of the ending theme Kaze mo Sora mo Kitto... which aired during the first few episodes of Sailor Stars was never released on CD.

Bishōjo Senshi Sailor Moon Sailor Stars Music Collection Vol.2
 was released on March 17, 2010 as an HQCD.

This soundtrack features BGM from the Three Lights portion of Sailor Stars. Most of the tracks on this album are duplicated on Memorial Music Box Disc 7.
Track 15 Kyuukyoku no Ai ("Ultimate Love") is borrowed from Johann Sebastian Bach's "Prelude in C Major". The track is also included on Memorial Music Box Disc 7 - Track 22.

 

Bonus Tracks

Pretty Guardian Sailor Moon: The 20th Anniversary Memorial Tribute
 was released on March 17, 2010 as an HQCD.

 

Bonus Tracks

Pretty Guardian Sailor Moon: The 25th Anniversary Memorial Tribute
 was released on April 4, 2018 as an HQCD.

 

Bonus Tracks

English-language soundtracks
This is a list of English-language soundtracks from the DiC dubbed anime series. Three albums were released from 1996 - 2002.

Sailor Moon - Songs from the Hit TV Series

Fred Patten highlighted "Oh Starry Night" and "Rainy Day Man" as being the best on the soundtrack, but felt that "She's Got the Power" was not specific enough to Sailor Moon.

Sailor Moon & The Scouts - Lunarock

Sailor Moon - The Full Moon Collection

*

Sailor Moon Crystal soundtracks

Sailor Moon Crystal Season I & II

Moon Pride

Sailor Moon Edition (CD+Blu-ray)

Momoiro Clover Z Edition (CD only)

Sailor Moon Crystal Original Soundtracks

Sailor Moon Crystal Character Song Collection: Crystal Collection

Sailor Moon Crystal Season III

New Moon ni Koishite/Eternal Eternity

New Moon ni Koishite/Otome no Susume

New Moon ni Koishite/Eien Dake ga Futari wo Kakeru

Sailor Moon Crystal Original Soundtrack II

Sailor Moon Eternal: The Movie

Tsukiiro Chainon (月色Chainon, Moon Color Chainon)

Momoiro Clover Z edition (CD+Blu-ray)

Eternal edition (CD+Blu-ray)

Sailor Moon Eternal: The Movie Character Song Collection: Eternal Collection

Sailor Moon Eternal: The Movie Original Soundtrack

Legacy
"Moonlight Densetsu" was released as a CD single in March 1992, and was an "explosive hit". "Moonlight Densetsu" won first place in the Song category in Animage's 15th and 16th Anime Grand Prix. It came seventh in the 17th Grand Prix, and "Moon Revenge", from Sailor Moon R: The Movie, came eighth. "Rashiku Ikimasho", the second closing song for SuperS, placed eighteenth in 1996.  In 1997, "Sailor Star Song", the new opening theme for Sailor Stars, came eleventh, and "Moonlight Densetsu" came sixteenth.

References

Soundtracks
Anime soundtracks
Film and television discographies
 
Lists of soundtracks
Soundtracks by media franchise